Desmond Fernandes is an author living in London.

He is a member of the Campaign Against Criminalising Communities (CAMPACC) and he was a Senior Lecturer in Human Geography (1994–2006) and The Geography of Genocide (2001–2006) at De Montfort University, Bedford, England, and has published widely in a number of journals, including The Thailand Environment Institute Quarterly, Socialist Lawyer, L'Appel du Kurdistan, Armenian Forum, Kurdistan Aktuell, and Law, Social Justice and Global Development.

Bibliography
The Kurdish and Armenian Genocides: From Censorship and Denial to Recognition? (2007, Apec, Stockholm) - 
The Kurdish Genocide in Turkey (2008, Apec, Stockholm, forthcoming)
Colonial Genocides in Turkey, Kenya and Goa (2008, Apec, Stockholm, forthcoming)
US, UK, German, Israeli and NATO 'Inspired' Psychological Warfare Operations in Turkey and Northern Iraq (2008, Apec, Stockholm, forthcoming).
(Co-author) Verfolgung, Krieg und Zerstorung Der Ethnischen Identitat: Genozid An Den Kurden In Der Turkei (2001, Medico International, Frankfurt),

British non-fiction writers
Year of birth missing (living people)
Living people
Academics of De Montfort University
British male writers
Male non-fiction writers